Stuffed melon are made of melon stuffed with meat (lamb) and rice.

See also
 List of melon dishes
 List of stuffed dishes

References

Balkan cuisine
Stuffed vegetable dishes
Turkish cuisine dolmas and sarmas
Melon dishes